Rafael Martínez Nadal (April 22, 1877 – July 6, 1941) was a Puerto Rican politician, senator, journalist, and businessman. He was the third president of the Senate of Puerto Rico, serving from 1933 to 1941.

Early years 
Rafael Martínez Nadal was born on April 22, 1877 in Mayagüez, Puerto Rico. He was an orphan from an early age, since his mother, Estebanía Nadal Freyre died hours after his birth, and his father, Rafael Martínez Santana, when he was only five years old. After that, he was raised in Maricao, Puerto Rico by his paternal aunts. He then studied in San Juan, Puerto Rico.

Professional life 
At the age of sixteen, his tutor sent him to Barcelona, Spain to study law. However, he interrupted his studies and went to live in Paris. He spent the next years between Paris, Madrid and Barcelona, where he was a businessman in fields as varied as bullfighting, meat distribution, theater production and coffee importation.

On August 13, 1904, Martínez Nadal returned to Mayagüez, where he dedicated to the business of coffee. He also became a journalist and joined the Puerto Rico Republican Party founded several years earlier by doctor José Celso Barbosa. In 1908 he founded the "El Combate" newspaper.  In 1912, he moved to Ponce and began studying again, receiving his law degree. His practice became so prominent that, even decades later, many court observers quipped a popular rhyme in Spanish, "Temblaba la corte, temblaba el fiscal, temblaban los jueces, cuando llegaba Martínez Nadal" ("the court trembled, the DA trembled, the judge trembled, when Martínez Nadal arrived").

Political career 

Martínez Nadal was elected in 1914 as a member of the Puerto Rico House of Delegates, the precursor of the Puerto Rico House of Representatives representing Ponce. As a member of the Republican Party of Puerto Rico, he was elected to the Senate of Puerto Rico in 1920.

When the Union Party joined the Republican Party in 1924 forming Alianza Puertorriqueña, Martínez Nadal left his party in disagreement. He then formed a party called the Partido Constitucional Histórico, aligning with the Socialist Party of Santiago Iglesias Pantín. He was then reelected in 1924 and 1928.

After the Alianza disbanded, Martínez Nadal formed another party called the Republican Union, under his presidency. He was reelected in 1932 and was elected President of the Senate of Puerto Rico. He served as such until his death from cancer on July 6, 1941 in Guaynabo, Puerto Rico. He was buried at Santa María Magdalena de Pazzis Cemetery in San Juan, Puerto Rico.

Legacy 
An expressway in Guaynabo is named after Martínez Nadal.

References 

1877 births
1941 deaths
Burials at Santa María Magdalena de Pazzis Cemetery
Members of the Senate of Puerto Rico
Puerto Rican lawyers
Republican Party (Puerto Rico) politicians
People from Mayagüez, Puerto Rico
Presidents of the Senate of Puerto Rico